The Czech Republic men's national under-20 basketball team is a national basketball team of the Czech Republic, administered by the Czech Basketball Federation. It represents the country in international men's under-20 basketball competitions.

FIBA U20 European Championship participations

See also
Czech Republic men's national basketball team
Czech Republic men's national under-18 basketball team
Czech Republic women's national under-20 basketball team

References

External links
Archived records of the Czech Republic team participations

Basketball in the Czech Republic
Basketball
Men's national under-20 basketball teams